Earl Franklin Leggett (March 5, 1933 – May 15, 2008) was an American football defensive lineman in the National Football League (NFL) for the Chicago Bears, Los Angeles Rams, and the New Orleans Saints. He played college football at Louisiana State University (LSU). He was also an assistant coach for various teams.

Leggett's career in professional football began as a first-round draft pick of the Bears in 1957 and spanned 11 years (1957–1968).  He is recorded as having played in 132 professional football games.

His career lasted from 1957 to 1965 with Chicago, where he played at both defensive tackle and defensive end positions. He was part of the famed "Monsters of the Midway" defense that led the Bears to the 1963 NFL championship. He was traded to the Los Angeles Rams in 1966, where he played in 10 regular season games with the Rams' "Fearsome Foursome" defense.

Toward the end of his career, journeyman Leggett played 20 games in 1967 and 1968 for the expansion New Orleans Saints franchise. While statistics on sacks were not recorded back then, www.pro-football-reference.com credits Leggett with 16 fumble recoveries, 1 safety and 1 interception.

Leggett did outstanding community service in Mississippi and the Gulf Coast region.  He first played college football at Hinds Jr. College (today known as Hinds Community College) which was the only school that would give him a chance due to academic circumstances. He started playing for them at 16 (which was then legal) and was able to raise his academic standing to get into LSU. Leggett became an All-Southeastern Conference player at LSU.

Leggett had four children and 14 grandchildren.

Coaching career
Leggett helped shape the careers of Howie Long with the Raiders and Michael Strahan with the New York Giants. He introduced Long into the Pro Football Hall of Fame in  2000.

References

External links

1933 births
2008 deaths
American football defensive ends
American football defensive tackles
Chicago Bears players
Denver Broncos coaches
Hinds Eagles football players
Los Angeles Raiders coaches
Los Angeles Rams players
LSU Tigers football players
New Orleans Saints players
New York Giants coaches
Oakland Raiders coaches
San Francisco 49ers coaches
Robert E. Lee High School (Jacksonville) alumni
Seattle Seahawks coaches
Washington Redskins coaches
People from Palatka, Florida
Players of American football from Jacksonville, Florida